Hollow Ground may refer to:
 Hollow Ground (album), 2018 album by American musician Cut Worms
 Hollow Ground (band), an English heavy metal music band
 hollow grind, a way in which a knife blade may be ground